Mohd Faizal Hussein (born 31 May 1967) is a Malaysian actor. He made his acting debut in 1972 and is known for his role as Roy in the 1986 teen film Gila-Gila Remaja, directed by his father Hussein Abu Hassan. In 2019, Harian Metro listed him as one of the top 10 best Malaysian actors of all time.

Career
Faizal made his first film appearance in the film Darah Panglima in 1972, at the age of five.

Starting acting in 1982 with the film Senja Merah, he jumped up after starring Gila-Gila Remaja in 1986 as Azroy. Directed by his father, the late Hussein Abu Hassan, he made a huge impact for Faizal to prove his family's artistic blood.

After that, he gained a lot of attention and starred in several films that featured him playing the protagonist. After almost three years of not appearing in a movie, he finally got the offer to bring the antagonist through Leftenan Adnan. His attempt succeeded, and led to various protagonist characters he brought to the film, as well as drama.

Faizal appeared with Saiful Apek and Zul Yahya in a comedy investigation action film MX3 directed by Yusof Kelana on 25 November 2003.

In 2013, Faizal returned to the role of Azroy in a movie directed by V. Nagaraj, Gila-Gila Remaja 2, the continuation of the 1985 movie, Gila-Gila Remaja that directed by his father. This film was also starred by Hairul Azreen, Faralyna Idris, Taiyuddin Bakar, Fizz Fairuz, and Bella Dally.

On 17 January 2015, Faizal played the main character along with Sari Yanti in the television film, Penjara Seorang Isteri based on Salmah and Zaid's wedding on the basis of mutual love and their marriage was given two shades. In this television film, based on a true story, Faizal acted as Zaid.

Working under the direction of Pekin Ibrahim, Faizal succeeded in acting as Pit in the film Mat Moto released on 14 January 2016.

Personal life 
Faizal has a wife, Suhaila Sulaiman, who was also an actress. They have two children.

Filmography

Films

Television series

Telemovie

Television

Advertisements

Music video

Discography

References

External links 
 
 

1967 births
Living people
People from Selangor
Malaysian people of Malay descent
Malaysian male actors
20th-century Malaysian male actors
Malaysian Muslims
Malaysian television actors
Malaysian film actors